343 Industries is an American video game developer located in Redmond, Washington, part of Xbox Game Studios. Headed by Pierre Hintze, the studio is responsible for the Halo series of military science fiction games, originally created and produced by Bungie, and is the developer of the Slipspace Engine. Named after the Halo character 343 Guilty Spark, the studio was established in 2007 after the departure of Bungie.

After co-developing downloadable content for Halo: Reach, Bungie's final Halo game, 343 Industries released Halo: Combat Evolved Anniversary and Halo 4, the latter starting the studio's "Reclaimer Saga" of the mainline games.

History

Formation
Developer Bungie were acquired by Microsoft in 2000, and their in-development project Halo turned into a launch title for Microsoft's Xbox console. In 2007, shortly after shipping Halo 3, Bungie announced its split from Microsoft. The rights to Halo remained with the latter. To oversee the Halo franchise, Microsoft created 343 Industries that same year, named after Halo character 343 Guilty Spark. Bungie continued making Halo games until Halo: Reach in 2010.

Development
In July 2009, it was announced that 343 Industries was working on a seven-part Halo anime series called Halo Legends. Later that year the studio created Halo Waypoint, a downloadable application that tracks a user's Halo accomplishments. 343i also increased staff for Halo development, recruiting 20 staff from the now defunct Pandemic Studios. 343i also developed Halo: Reachs second and third map packs, entitled "Defiant" and "Anniversary" respectively, in conjunction with Certain Affinity. The company was responsible for the remastered version of Halo: Combat Evolved, titled Halo: Combat Evolved Anniversary, which was released on November 15, 2011, to celebrate the 10th year since the release of the first franchise installment on November 15, 2001.

Following Bungie's completion of their last Halo title, Halo: Reach, 343 Industries was eventually given complete control of the Halo franchise including servers and data on March 31, 2012. The studio's development of Halo 4, which began in 2009, was completed in September. It was released on November 6, 2012, as the first title of a new Halo Reclaimer Trilogy which will include at least two more installments over the years. At E3 2013, Microsoft and 343i announced the next "Halo" installment set for release on the Xbox One. Shortly after the announcement, the Reclaimer Trilogy was confirmed by Microsoft Studios corporate vice-president Phil Spencer to be expanded into a Reclaimer Saga. The following year at E3 2014, the official title was revealed as "Halo 5: Guardians" along with plans for its release on October 27, 2015. Microsoft, in a contract with Mega Bloks, is in conjunction with 343i to manufacture a new line of toys and other memorabilia for the upcoming Halo saga. Halo 5: Guardians was released on October 27, 2015, with semi-exclusive content to those who purchased select Mega Bloks sets. 343 Industries has since released free monthly content updates since Halo 5's launch.

At E3 2018, Microsoft Studios and 343 Industries announced the next Halo game, titled Halo Infinite, which was originally scheduled to launch in holiday 2020 for Xbox One and Windows PCs, in addition to being a launch title for the next Xbox console, the Xbox Series X. However, the game was delayed to release in 2021, in part due to the COVID-19 pandemic forcing the 343 staff to switch to remote work. Infinite was the first game to be developed using 343's in-house Slipspace Engine.

After Infinites release, 343 Industries supported the game via updates. On September 12, 2022, Bonnie Ross announced she would step down as studio head. Following her departure, her responsibilities were split into three positions. Pierre Hintze took over as studio head, Bryan Koski became GM of the franchise and Elizabeth Van Wyck took over business and operations. Amid wider layoffs in the tech industry and Microsoft, 343 was heavily affected, and Bloomberg News reported the studio would be making large changes to its development structure going forward.

Games developed

References

External links
 

 
2007 establishments in Washington (state)
American companies established in 2007
Companies based in Redmond, Washington
First-party video game developers
Microsoft subsidiaries
Video game companies established in 2007
Video game companies of the United States
Video game development companies
Xbox Game Studios